Christopher Hollis (born 24 June 1998) is a South African rugby union player for the Griquas (rugby union) in the Currie Cup. His regular position is centre or wing.

Hollis attended and played first team rugby for Queen's College in Queenstown, earning an inclusion in Border's U18 squad for the 2016 Craven Week held in Durban.

References

South African rugby union players
Living people
1998 births
People from Tsolwana Local Municipality
Rugby union centres
Rugby union wings
Southern Kings players
Griquas (rugby union) players
Lions (United Rugby Championship) players
Rugby union players from the Eastern Cape
Eastern Province Elephants players
Stormers players